Nivedita Setu (also called Second Vivekananda Setu) is a multi-span extradosed bridge completed 2007 over Hooghly River connecting Howrah with Kolkata, in West Bengal. It runs parallel to and about 50 m downstream of the old Vivekananda Setu opened in 1932. The bridge is named after Sister Nivedita, the social worker-disciple of Swami Vivekananda. Belghoria Expressway that connects the meeting point of NH 16 with NH 19 at Dankuni to NH 12, NH 112, Dumdum/Kolkata Airport and northern parts of Kolkata passes over the bridge. The bridge is designed to carry 48,000 vehicles per day.

Design 

The 1932 Vivekananda Setu had become weak as a result of ageing and with heavy traffic even repairs became difficult. There was need for a second bridge.

The main challenge was to design and construct a new bridge that did not mar the view of the old Vivekananda Setu, did not dwarf the historically important Dakshineswar Kali Temple which is located well within visible distance, and carry substantially higher levels of fast traffic for around half a century.

The bridge rests on deep-well foundations going down to the river bed level. It carries six lanes for high speed traffic. The carriageway is supported by 254 pre-stressed concrete girders. Cables from 14m high pylons extend additional support.

Nivedita Setu is the first bridge in the country that is a single profile cable-stayed bridge.  By design, the height of the columns are lower than the tip of the Dakshineswar temple.

Construction
This bridge is estimated to cost approximately Rs. 6,50 crore. The construction of the bridge started in April 2004, by the construction giant Larsen and Toubro and was opened to traffic in a record time in July 2007.

The bridge is the India's first multi-span, single-plane cable-supported extradosed bridge; with short pylons and seven continuous spans of 110 m, totaling a length of 880 m (2,887 feet).  It is 29 m wide and supports 6 lanes of traffic.

Award
Nivedita Setu has won an Award of Excellence from the American Segmental Bridge Institute, USA.

Toll
As of 2020, the toll charges for using Nivedita Setu are: 
 ₹ 50— light passenger vehicles
 ₹ 65 — buses
 ₹ 99–₹ 183 — trucks and multi-axle vehicles.

See also
List of longest bridges in the world
List of longest bridges above water in India

References

External links

Image of bridge
Another image of bridge

Extradosed bridges in India
Toll bridges in India
Bridges in Kolkata
Bridges over the Ganges
Sister Nivedita
Buildings and structures in Howrah district
Transport in Howrah
Tourist attractions in Howrah
2007 establishments in West Bengal
Bridges completed in 2007